In Maharashtra, Chatrapati Shivaji Raje was addressed as King or Raje. Also, other clans of the Maratha community put Raje before their original clan name; Raje Shirke, Raje Mahadik, Raje Kadam, Raje Chalukya, Raje Jadhavrao etc or used it as a suffix to their names like Santaji Raje, Maloji Raje, Raghoji Raje etc.

See also
 Maratha
 Maratha Empire
 List of Maratha dynasties and states
 Maratha titles
 Sardar
 Mankari
 Deshmukh
 Zamindar
 Jagirdar

References

Indian feudalism
Titles of national or ethnic leadership